In telecommunication, frame synchronization or framing is the process by which, while receiving a stream of framed data, incoming frame alignment signals (i.e., a distinctive bit sequences or syncwords) are identified (that is, distinguished from data bits), permitting the data bits within the frame to be extracted for decoding or retransmission.

Framing 
If the transmission is temporarily interrupted, or a bit slip event occurs, the receiver must re-synchronize.

The transmitter and the receiver must agree ahead of time on which frame synchronization scheme they will use.

Common frame synchronization schemes are:

Framing bit A common practice in telecommunications, for example in T-carrier, is to insert, in a dedicated time slot within the frame, a noninformation bit or framing bit that is used for synchronization of the incoming data with the receiver. In a bit stream, framing bits indicate the beginning or end of a frame. They occur at specified positions in the frame, do not carry information, and are usually repetitive.
Syncword framing Some systems use a special syncword at the beginning of every frame.
CRC-based framing Some telecommunications hardware uses CRC-based framing.

Frame synchronizer

In telemetry applications, a frame synchronizer is used to frame-align a serial pulse code-modulated (PCM) binary stream.

The frame synchronizer immediately follows the bit synchronizer in most telemetry applications. Without frame synchronization, decommutation is impossible.

The frame synchronization pattern is a known binary pattern which repeats at a regular interval within the PCM stream. The frame synchronizer recognizes this pattern and aligns the data into minor frames or sub-frames. Typically the frame sync pattern is followed by a counter (sub-frame ID) which dictates which minor or sub-frame in the series is being transmitted.  This becomes increasingly important in the decommutation stage where all data is deciphered as to what attribute was sampled.  Different commutations require a constant awareness of which section of the major frame is being decoded.

See also
 Asynchronous start-stop
 Phase synchronization
 Self-synchronizing code
 Superframe

References

Scientific articles
 J. L. Massey. "Optimum frame synchronization ". IEEE trans. comm., com-20(2):115-119, April 1972.
 R Scholtz. "Frame synchronization techniques", IEEE Transactions on Communications, 1980.
 P. Robertson. "Optimal Frame Synchronization for Continuous and Packet Data Transmission", PhD Dissertation, 1995, Fortschrittberichte VDI Reihe 10, Nr. 376 PDF

Data transmission
Synchronization